Motnya is a rural locality (a selo) in Bichursky District, Republic of Buryatia, Russia. The population was 239 as of 2010. There are 2 streets.

Geography 
Motnya is located 24 km northeast of Bichura (the district's administrative centre) by road. Novosretenka is the nearest rural locality.

References 

Rural localities in Bichursky District